Arthur Mills may refer to:

 Arthur Mills (footballer, born 1906) (1906–?), English professional association football player of the 1930s
 Arthur Mills (Australian footballer) (1905–1984), Australian rules footballer 
 Arthur Mills (MP) (1816–1898), British Conservative Party Member of Parliament for Taunton and Exeter
 Arthur Mills, 3rd Baron Hillingdon (1891–1952), British Member of Parliament for Uxbridge
 Arthur F. H. Mills (1887–1955), author
 Arthur Wallis Mills (1878–1940), British artist
 Art Mills (1903–1975), National League baseball pitcher and coach
 Arthur Mills (Indian Army officer) (1879–1964), general in the British Indian Army
 Arthur Mills (cricketer) (1923–2001), New Zealand cricketer
 A. J. Mills (songwriter) (Arthur John Mills, 1872–1919), English lyricist of music hall songs

See also
Arthur Mills Lea (1868–1932), Australian entomologist
Arthur Mill, a copper smelting mill in Magna, Utah